The Bellevue Squash Classic is a squash tournament that takes place in Bellevue, Washington in May. The first edition of the tournament took place from May 14-20, 2017. The tournament was an especially significant event and milestone for the PSA World Tour as it was the largest ever prize money purse for a 16-player draw.

Past Results

Men's

References

External links
 Official website
 Squash site 2011 website

PSA World Tour
Annual sporting events in the United States
Annual events in Washington (state)